"I Don't Mind" is the third single by punk rock band Buzzcocks, released in 1978. It charted at number 55 in the UK Singles Chart. Backed with "autonomy", both songs appear on the Buzzcocks' debut album, Another Music in a Different Kitchen.

Track listing
"I Don't Mind" (Pete Shelley) [2:18]
"Autonomy" (Steve Diggle) [3:43]

References

1978 singles
Buzzcocks songs
Song recordings produced by Martin Rushent
Songs written by Pete Shelley
1978 songs
United Artists Records singles